Yale Divinity School (YDS) is one of the twelve graduate and professional schools of Yale University in New Haven, Connecticut.

Congregationalist theological education was the motivation at the founding of Yale, and the professional school has its roots in a Theological Department established in 1822. The school had maintained its own campus, faculty, and degree program since 1869, and it has become more ecumenical beginning in the mid-19th century. Since the 1970s, it has been affiliated with the Episcopal Berkeley Divinity School and has housed the Institute of Sacred Music, which offers separate degree programs. In July 2017, a two-year process of formal affiliation was completed, with the addition of Andover Newton Seminary joining the school. Over 40 different denominations are represented at YDS.

History

Theological education was the earliest academic purpose of Yale University. When Yale College was founded in 1701, it was as a college of religious training for Congregationalist ministers in Connecticut Colony, designated in its charter as a school "wherein Youth may be instructed in the Arts & Sciences who through the blessing of Almighty God may be fitted for Publick employment both in Church & Civil State."  A professorship of divinity was established in 1746. In 1817, the occupant of the divinity chair, Eleazar Thompson Fitch, supported a student request to endow a theological curriculum, and five years later a separate  was founded by the Yale Corporation. In the same motion, Second Great Awakening theologian Nathaniel William Taylor was appointed to become the first Dwight Professor of Didactic Theology. Taylor was considered the "central figure" in the school's founding, and he was joined in 1826 by Josiah Willard Gibbs, Sr., a scholar of sacred languages and lexicographer Chauncey A. Goodrich in 1839. A dedicated student dormitory, Divinity College, was completed on the college's Old Campus in 1836, but the department had no permanent classrooms or offices until several years after the end of the American Civil War.

After a significant period of enrollment decline, the school began fundraising from alumni for new faculty and facilities. Divinity Hall was constructed on the present-day site of Grace Hopper College between 1869 and 1871, featuring two classroom wings and a chapel.  Around the time of the new campus' construction came the arrival of new faculty, including James M. Hoppin, George Edward Day, George Park Fisher, and Leonard Bacon. The first Bachelor of Divinity (B.D.) was conferred in 1867, and the department became a separate School of Divinity in 1869. The school remained across from Old Campus until 1929, when a new campus was constructed on the northern edge of the university campus, at the top of Prospect Hill.

Berkeley Divinity School affiliated with Yale Divinity School in 1971, and in the same year the university replaced the B.D. with a Master of Divinity (M.Div.) program.  While Berkeley retains its Episcopal Church connection, its students are admitted by and fully enrolled as members of Yale Divinity School. The Jonathan Edwards Center at Yale University, a division of the Divinity School, maintains a large collection of primary source materials about Jonathan Edwards, a 1720 Yale alumnus. The Yale Institute of Sacred Music (ISM) is jointly-affiliated with the Divinity School and School of Music. It offers programs in choral conducting, organ performance, voice, and church music studies, and in liturgical studies and religion and the arts.

In May 2016, Andover Newton Theological School president Martin Copenhaver announced that Andover Newton would begin a process of formal affiliation with the Divinity School over the next two years. In the 2016–17 academic year, a cohort of faculty relocated to New Haven teaching students and launching pilot initiatives focused on congregational ministry education, while Andover Newton continued to operate in Massachusetts over the next two years. In July 2017, a formal affiliation was signed, resulting in smaller Andover Newton functioning as a unit within Yale Divinity School, similar to its arrangement with Berkeley.

In October 2020, YDS received a $1 million grant from the Lilly Endowment as part of the foundation's Thriving Congregations Initiative to fund a program entitled, "Reimagining Church: New Models for the 21st Century." Reimagining Church will involve 40 congregations in Connecticut as well as YDS students, faculty, and staff over a five-year period.

In November 2020, the Yale Divinity School Women's Center revived the publication of The Voice Journal of Literary and Theological Ideas, a feminist journal that initially ran from 1996 to 2002.

Degrees 
Yale Divinity School is accredited by the Association of Theological Schools in the United States and Canada (ATS) and approved by ATS to grant the following degrees:

 Master of Divinity (M.Div.)
 Master of Arts in Religion (M.A.R.)
 Master of Sacred Theology (S.T.M.)
Students pursuing an M.A.R. can choose between a comprehensive and concentrated program. The following concentrations are offered: 

 Hebrew Bible
 Second Temple Judaism
 New Testament
 Theology
 Philosophical Theology
 Practical Theology
 Ethics
 History of Christianity
 World Christianity/Missions
 Liturgical Studies
 Religion & the Arts
 Asian Religions
 Black Religion in the African Diaspora
 Latinx & Latin American Christianity
 Religion & Ecology
 Women’s/Gender/Sexuality Studies

Students in any degree program at Yale Divinity School can also earn certificates in any of the following areas:

 Lutheran Studies 
 Reformed Studies 
 Anglican Studies
 Catholic Lay Ministerial Studies
 United Methodist Studies 
 Black Church Studies 
 Andover Newton Seminary (non-degree diploma) 
 Educational Leadership and Ministry

Leadership 
Gregory E. Sterling, a New Testament scholar and Church of Christ pastor, has been the dean of the divinity school since 2012, succeeding New Testament scholar Harold W. Attridge, who returned to teaching as a Sterling Professor upon completing two five-year terms as dean. The leaders of the affiliated seminaries are Andrew McGowan, Dean and President of Berkeley Divinity School, and Sarah Drummond, Founding Dean of Andover Newton Seminary at Yale Divinity School. Organist Martin Jean is director of the Institute of Sacred Music.

Deans of Yale Divinity School

Campus

When the department was organized as a school in 1869, it was moved to a campus across from the northwest corner of the New Haven Green composed of East Divinity Hall (1869), Marquand Chapel (1871), West Divinity Hall (1871), and the Trowbridge Library (1881). The buildings, designed by Richard Morris Hunt, were demolished under the residential college plan and replaced by Calhoun College, now known as Grace Hopper College.

In 1929, the trustees of the estate of lawyer John William Sterling agreed that a portion of his bequest to Yale would be used to build a new campus for the Divinity School. The Sterling Divinity Quadrangle, completed in 1932, is a Georgian-style complex built at the top of Prospect Hill. It was designed by Delano & Aldrich and modeled in part on the University of Virginia.

A $49-million renovation of Sterling Divinity Quadrangle was completed in 2003. Sterling Divinity Quadrangle contains academic buildings, Marquand Chapel, and graduate student housing for YDS students.

Yale Divinity School is currently planning the construction of the Living Village, a zero-waste, sustainable living community that will house 155 YDS students.

Notable alumni

 Diogenes Allen (B.D. 1959)
 Ian Barbour (B.D. 1956)
Kate Bowler (M.A.R. 2005)
 Gregory A. Boyd (M.Div. 1982)
 Will D. Campbell (B.D. 1952)
 Orishatukeh Faduma (B.D. 1894, graduate study 1895)
 William Ragsdale Cannon (B.D. 1940; Ph.D. 1942), Professor and Dean, Candler School of Theology; Bishop of the United Methodist Church.
 Donald Eric Capps, (B.D. 1963; S.T.M., 1965), scholar of Pastoral Theology
 Roy Clyde Clark, (B.D. 1944), Bishop of the United Methodist Church
 William Sloane Coffin (B.D. 1956)
 Chris Coons (Master's degree in ethics, 1992), United States Senator from Delaware
 Harvey Cox (B.D. 1955), theologian and Hollis Professor of Divinity at Harvard Divinity School (1965–2009)
 Zebulon Crocker
 Raymond Culver, (B.D. 1920), president of Shimer College
 Michael Curry (M.Div. 1978), Presiding Bishop of the Episcopal Church (United States)
 John Danforth (M.Div. 1963), former United States Senator from Missouri
 Walter Fauntroy, (B.D. 1958), Founding Member - Congressional Black Caucus
 David F. Ford (S.T.M.), Regius Professor of Divinity Emeritus at the University of Cambridge
 Milton Gaither (M.A.R. 1996), historian of American education
 Paul Vernon Galloway, a Bishop of The Methodist Church
Tom Vaughn (Doctorate in theology), jazz musician and Episcopal priest
 Leroy Gilbert (S.T.M. 1979)
 Gary Hart (B.D. 1961)
 Stanley Hauerwas (B.D. 1965)
 Richard B. Hays (M.Div. 1977)
 Serene Jones (M.Div. 1985) President of Union Theological Seminary (New_York_City)
 Rena Karefa-Smart (B.D. 1945), first Black woman graduate of Yale Divinity
 Sen Katayama
 Ernest W. Lefever (1945), foreign affairs expert and founder of the Ethics and Public Policy Center.
Sallie McFague (B.D. 1959)
 Candida Moss (M.A.R. 2002)
 Otis Moss III (M.Div. 1995), Pastor of Trinity Church, Chicago
 Reinhold Niebuhr (B.D. 1914, M.A. 1915), Protestant theologian and public intellectual
 Richard T. Nolan (M.A. 1967)
 Douglas Oldenburg (S.T.M. 1961), President Emeritus at Columbia Theological Seminary, Presbyterian (USA) pastor.
 Julie Faith Parker
 William H. Poteat (B.D. 1944)
 Clark V. Poling (1936)
 Peter L. Pond, human rights activist and philanthropist.
 Adam Clayton Powell, Sr. (attended 1895–1896)
 George Rupp
 Father V.C. Samuel (PhD. 1957) Indian Christian Theologian and Historian.
 Ron Sider
 John Silber
 John Shelby Spong
 Amos Alonzo Stagg
 Rufus W. Stimson (B.D., 1897), Professor of English and President of the University of Connecticut
 Barbara Brown Taylor (M.Div. 1976)
 Roy M. Terry (B.D. 1942)
 Krista Tippett (M.Div. 1994)
 R. A. Torrey (B.D. 1878)
 John W. Traphagan (M.A.R. 1986), professor of Religious Studies and Anthropology, University of Texas at Austin
 Glenn M. Wagner (M.Div. 1978)
 Chester Wickwire (B.D. 1946)
 Parker T. Williamson (M.Phil.)
 William Willimon (M.Div. 1971)

Notable past professors

Former faculty: 20th–21st centuries 
Roland Bainton
Brevard Childs
Rebecca Chopp
Adela Yarbro Collins, 2000–2015
Jerome Davis
Margaret Farley
Hans Wilhelm Frei
Paul L. Holmer
Serene Jones
David Kelsey
Kenneth Scott Latourette
George Lindbeck
Sallie McFague
Douglas Clyde Macintosh
Reinhold Niebuhr
H. Richard Niebuhr
Henri Nouwen, 1971–1981
Liston Pope (Dean)
Letty M. Russell (1974–2001)
Lamin Sanneh
Emilie Townes
Denys Turner
Nicholas Wolterstorff
Henry Burt Wright (1877-1923)

Former faculty: 19th century 
Lyman Beecher
George Park Fisher

Current faculty (ca. 2019) 

Harold W. Attridge
Teresa Berger
John J. Collins
Michal Beth Dinkler
John E. Hare
Erika Helgen
Jennifer A. Herdt
Willie James Jennings
Yii-Jan Lin
Eboni Marshall Turman
Donyelle McCray
Andrew McGowan
Joyce Mercer
Mary Clark Moschella
Laura Nasrallah
Sally M. Promey
Melanie Ross
Janet Ruffing
Carolyn J. Sharp
Chloë Starr
Kathryn Tanner
Gabrielle Thomas
Linn Tonstad
Jacqueline Vayntrub
Miroslav Volf
Tisa Wenger
Christian Wiman
Almeda M. Wright

See also
 General Theological Seminary, a separate New Haven institution now located in New York City

References

External links
 Yale Divinity School website
 Berkeley Divinity School at Yale
 Andover Newton Seminary at Yale

 
Religion and science
Educational institutions established in 1822
1822 establishments in Connecticut
Seminaries and theological colleges in Connecticut
Divinity School
Christian seminaries and theological colleges